Nias people are an ethnic group native to Nias, an island off the west coast of North Sumatra, Indonesia. In the Nias language, the Nias people are known as Ono Niha, which literally means 'descendants of human'. Nias island is known as Tanö Niha, with Tanö meaning 'land' in the Nias language.

The Nias people are a community that continues living within the norms and practices of their indigenous culture. Customary law of the Nias people is generally referred to as fondrakö, which regulates all aspects of life from birth to death. Historical evidence of megalithic structures and stone carvings that are found in the interior of the island proved that ancient Nias people practiced megalith culture. The caste system is also recognized in Nias society, whereby the highest level out of the 12 levels in the Nias caste system is Balugu. In order to reach this level of the caste, one must be able to carry out big festivals by inviting thousands of people and slaughtering thousands of pigs for several days.

Origins

Mythology 

According to the people of Nias, one of the mythical origins of Nias tribe comes from a tree of life called Tora Sigaru'a which is located at a place called Tetehöli Ana'a. According to the myth, it is said that the arrival of the first human on Nias island began in the days of King Sirao, whose nine sons had been banished out of Tetehöli Ana'a for fighting over the throne. Hence the nine sons of King Sirao were considered as the first people to set foot on the island of Nias.

Archaeological observations 

Archaeological research has been conducted on Nias island since 1999. The observations found that there has been human habitation on Nias island since 12,000 years ago through migration from  Asia to Nias island during the Paleolithic period. In fact there are indications of migration as far as 30,000 years ago. During that period the Hòa Bình, Vietnam civilization was similar to that in Nias island. Therefore, it was presumed that the origins of the Nias people came from an area in mainland Asia that is in modern-day Vietnam.

New genetic research has found that the Nias people of North Sumatra came from the Austronesian peoples. The ancestors of the Nias people are also thought to have come from Taiwan through the Philippines 4,000 to 5,000 years ago.

Ten years of researching involving blood samples of 440 Nias people in 11 villages in Nias island showed the Y-chromosome and DNA mitochondria of the Nias people are very similar to the Taiwanese aborigines and Filipino peoples. The observation has also found that the genes in today's Nias people no longer carry any traces of the ancient Nias people, as of those whose remains were found in the Togi Ndrawa cave, Central Nias. Archaeological findings of the stone tools found showed that humans lived in the cave over 12,000 years ago. The genetic diversity of the Nias people is very low compared to other groups of people, especially with regard to the Y-chromosome. This indicates that there was once a "bottle neck" population in the past history of Nias. Studies have also found that the Nias people do not share any genes with ethnicities living in the Andaman-Nicobar islands in the Indian ocean, which are geographically considered as neighbours. Although it is known that there was a migration of the Austronesian peoples between Taiwan and the Indonesian archipelago including Nias, it is still uncertain if the migration started from Taiwan to Nias or vice versa.

Nias clans 
Nias people practice a clan system that follows the paternal lineage. Clans generally come from the existing village settlements.

Culture

Religion
The predominant religion is Protestant Christianity. Six out of seven Niasans are Protestant; the remainder are about evenly divided between Muslim and Catholic. Whilst the first missionaries visited Nias in 1865,Christianity grew rapidly in the early 1900's when the Dutch established control of the island, however was adopted and spread by local ministers. This is in contrast to Northern Sumatra in which Christian churches have been burnt down and dismantled due to 'not having building permits'.

Village and architecture

Nias people lives in highly organized villages. Nias villages often possess impressive stone monuments and large houses which stood on earthquake-resistant timber pylons. Most of these villages have lost its old houses because of their deterioration and difficulties in maintaining the ancient wooden structures from rot, insects and wear, and hence replaced by other more generic structures. Other reasons why not so many old houses were rebuilt because of the over-harvesting of the forests. 

In the past, Nias villages, especially those of South Nias, were strategically built on top of a ridge or hill and were surrounded by ramparts and security gates. Entry into this village was provided by only two gates via steep staircases. The gates lead to a straight paved avenue which run through the village center, with row of traditional houses on the sides of the avenue. Close to the main square of the village was the house of the village founders, the omo sebua. In Nias villages, the space in front of each houses was the property of the inhabitants. This "front courtyard" was used for mundane activities e.g. drying harvests before storing.

Villages in Central Nias was usually smaller than its southern counterpart. The houses are also positioned farther away from the main avenue.

Wooden figures

The people of Nias placed great value on wooden figures or adu. The sole purpose of the Nias figures was to fulfil ritual needs, whether it is to ensure wealth or to perform specific beneficial rite.

When an elderly person died, the family would make a wooden statue known as adu zatua. The statue was unveiled on the fourth day after the death of the person. The shape of the wooden statue reflects the status of the person who used them: the more powerful the owner, the more impressive the statue will be made. Nias people believed that the deceased person's spirits reside in the statue, so all events that occurred in the family were shared with the ancestor statues through prayers. Ancestor figures were believed to ensure fertility for the family, livestock and agricultural land. Sacrifices were made to the ancestor statues especially on important events e.g. births, marriages and deaths. Ancestor statues were placed in the main room of the house, sometimes more than a hundred. A missionary work in 1930 had recorded the removal of 'over 2000 "idols" from a house of new northern convert.' Some missionaries even recorded houses collapsing under the weight of these ancestor figures. Small adu zatua were bound together horizontally using a rattan and pegs. 

In North Nias, large impressive ancestor figure is known as adu suraha salawa (Nias language for "portraits of honored ancestors"). The adu suraha salawa represents the first known ancestor of a family, often the founder of the village. The adu suraha salawa were usually placed upon a wall or on an altar (daro-daro). Another large ancestor statues are the adu hörö. Adu hörö ancestor statues are large, elongated, armless and wear high, forked headdresses. These statues are generally found in Central Nias, and rarely in South Nias. 

Other wooden figures do not represent the ancestors. These wooden figures were created to heal specific illnesses, to protect villages, or to invoke supernatural beings to aid through rituals. These statues were generally crudely made, as opposed to the finely carved ancestor figures. Joachim von Brenner-Felsach classified more than 60 types of non-ancestor wooden figures. 

Many ancestor figures were destroyed in 1916 by Christian missionary movements which saw them as an old blasphemous religious symbol. Some were sold to collectors and can be found in museum or private collections around the world.

Stone monuments

The Nias produced one of the most impressive megalith culture in Indonesia, especially the Center and South Nias. Stones were used to construct different objects and structures. Nias village features impressive stoneworks e.g. large staircases and broad paved streets. Ritual objects e.g. the behu (vertical column), standing columns, jumping stones, obelisks, altars, and sarcophagi are among the many stone objects produced by Nias people.  

Stone monuments were central in the owasa festival, a kind of feast to raise the rank of a person. Dedicating stone monuments publicly is considered as one of the several requirements that must be done by a person to proof that he had fulfilled the right to claim a higher rank and to receive honorary titles.  

The behu is a type of megalith in the form of vertical column. Behu were erected in front of the house of the host to commemorate former great celebrations held by the host. The more behu displayed in front of the host's house, the more powerful his position are in the village. Noblemen display behu that is larger in size and more abundant in numbers than the commoners. A behu with anthropomorphic form is known as the osa-osa. The osa-osa is depicted as wearing traditional Nias attire e.g. the kalabubu necklace and pendant earrings (fondulu or saro dalinga). The osa-osa'''s head is that of the various beasts, usually a lasara, a hornbill, a stag, or a multi-headed mixture of all. Before displaying the osa-osa in front of houses, they were paraded around the village with the host seated, or even standing on top of the osa-osa. 

Household objects
Nias people produce household objects carved with zoomorphic, floral, or geometric motifs. Below are a list of utilitarian objects produced by the Nias people.
 Bari gana'a: A miniature jewellery box.
 Bowoa Tanö: Clay potDoghi (North Nias); fogao, dröghija (South Nias): A wooden coconut grater used to grate coconut meat to produce coconut milk or coconut oil, an important ingredients in Nias cuisine. 
 Figa lae: Banana leaf used as plates
 Halu: A paddy pounder
 Haru: A wooden spoon, the base of the handle is carved with various forms e.g. a fist.
 Katidi: Weavings from bamboo
 Lösu: Mortar and pestle Niru: A tool to separate rice from its husk
 Gala: Tray-like item made of wood
 Sole Mbanio: A drinking container made from coconut shell 
 Tumba, lauru: A tankard used to weigh rice 

Weapons

Today the Nias people are almost always presented as a warlike people known for their headhunting tradition and inter-villages conflicts in the past, where manufacture of weapons are highly regarded above agriculture implements. Despite this, none of the war-like activities are carried out by the Nias people as the majority of the Nias people has been converted to Christianity. Nevertheless, the Nias people were still known as a skillful weapon and armor-makers.

The Nias people used a variety of material for the creation of their weaponry: leather, cord or woven fibres, precious metal, iron and brass. The Nias used spears, swords and blades as their weapon. The Nias spear (toto'a doho in the south, toho in the north) was mainly used for hunting; the shaft is made of dark hardwood of nibung palm wrapped with rattan. Other type of spears are the burusa, with a triangle-shaped head. The Nias sword (gari) is a combat weapon; both the sword and its sheath have simple undecorated form.  The most well-known of the Nias weapon is the balato or tolögu, a steel sword with a protective amulet believed to possess magical power. The balato has a hilt made of brass. The sheath of the balato contains a spherical bundle of rattan (ragö balatu) which performed as a protective amulet. This protective amulet is usually attached with a variety of objects e.g. animal fangs which is formed so that it looks like the jaw of the mythical lasara. The balato is only reserved for the highest nobles as a kind of proof of the authority and the social rank of its owner. 

Some prominent chiefs covered their armor with sheets of gold. Helmets can be made of iron or tightly woven palm fibers. The oval-shaped shield is known as the baluse in South Nias, while the North Nias produced a hexagonal-shaped shield known as the dange.

Cuisine
 Gowi Nihandro or Gowi Nitutu: Pounded cassava
 Harinake: Minced pork
 Godo-godo: Shredded cassava shaped into balls for boiling, and later with added coconut flakes
 Köfö-köfö: Minced fish meat shaped into balls to be dried or smoked
 Ni'owuru: Salted pork for longer storage
 Rakigae: Fried bananas
 Tamböyö: Ketupat
 löma: Lemang
 Gae Nibogö: Grilled bananas
 Kazimone: Made of sago
 Wawayasö: Glutinous rice
 Gulo-Gulo Farö: Candy made from distillate coconut milk
 Bato: Compressed crab meat shaped into balls for longer storage as found on Hinako Islands
 Nami: Salted crab eggs for longer storage, sometimes for months depending on the quantity of salt used
 Tuo nifarö: Palm wine
 Tuo mbanua: Raw palm wine with added laru, roots of various plants to give a certain amount of alcohol

Clothing and ornamentsFondruru, men's earring made of precious metal.Kalabubu, also known as the headhunter's necklace.Nifatali-tali, a necklace of precious metal.Nifato-fato, a men's necklace of precious metal.Suahu, a comb of wood or precious metal.

 Traditional proverbs 
 Hulö ni femanga mao, ihene zinga ("Like a cat that eats, starting from the sides"): When doing something, start from the easiest to the difficult.
 Hulö la'ewa nidanö ba ifuli fahalö-halö ("Just like chopping the water, it will still remain"): Something that is inseparable.
 Abakha zokho safuria moroi ba zi oföna'' ("The wound is more severe at the later stage than the beginning"): A course of action can be felt the most towards the end.

Other traditional practices 

 Fahombo: Leaping over the rock
 Fatele or Faluya or Faluaya: War dance
 Maena: Group dance
 Tari Moyo: Eagle dance
 Tari Mogaele
 Fangowai: Welcoming of guest dance
 Fame Ono Nihalö: Weddings
 Omo Hada: Traditional house
 Fame'e Töi Nono Nihalö: Given name of a married women
 Fasösö Lewuö: Bamboo competition among young men to test one's strength

Decline
Deterioration in Niassan culture began to occur since the end of the 19th-century. Missionary works had contributed to the decline of original Nias culture. Evangelization in Nias such as those performed by the German Protestant Rhenish Missionary Society had been responsible to the destruction of Niassan wooden statues as well the suppression of the unique culture of Nias society e.g. ancestor worship, magical practices, the Owasa festivals (noblemen rank-elevation festivals) headhunting and slave trading. However since 1955, conservation of the traditional culture of the Ono Niha has improved tremendously by the Roman Catholic Church through cultural integration into liturgy, architecture and art."

See also 

 Nias Expedition
 Nias language
 Proto-Malay
 Omo sebua

Notes

Bibliography

References

Ethnic groups in Indonesia
Ethnic groups in North Sumatra
Ethnic groups in Aceh